Christin Wurth-Thomas (born Christin Wurth on July 11, 1980) is an American athlete who competes in middle distance track events. Wurth-Thomas competed for the United States in the women's 1500 m at the 2008 Summer Olympics.

Wurth-Thomas was born in Bloomington, Illinois. While at the University of Arkansas, Wurth-Thomas was the Southeastern Conference Cross Country and 1500 m champion in 2002. In 2003, she finished 3rd in the 1500 m NCAA outdoor track and field championships.

Wurth-Thomas qualified for the 1500 m at the 2008 Summer Olympics by finishing 3rd at the 2008 U.S. Olympic trials (4:08.48). In Beijing, she finished 8th in the opening round, and did not qualify for the finals.

In 2009, she set a personal best in the 1500 m by running a 3:59:98 at the Golden Gala in Rome, at the time becoming only the 4th American female to break 4:00 at an outdoor 1500 m competition. She also qualified the 2009 World Championships by finishing second at the US Championships to Shannon Rowbury, with a time of 4:06.00. Wurth-Thomas finished 5th at the World Championships, with a time of 4:05.21.

Personal bests 

 All information taken from IAAF profile.

References

External links
 USA Track & Field: Christin Wurth-Thomas
 NBC Olympics Profile
 2009 Interview in Running Times

1980 births
Living people
American female middle-distance runners
Athletes (track and field) at the 2008 Summer Olympics
Olympic track and field athletes of the United States
Sportspeople from Bloomington, Illinois
Arkansas Razorbacks women's track and field athletes
People from Springdale, Arkansas